M/V Ocean Adventurer is an ice-capable expedition cruise ship operating commercial voyages to both polar regions, with Quark Expeditions of Seattle, WA, USA. The vessel was renamed on 1 October 2012, having previously been registered as "Clipper Adventurer". She is the sister ship to the MV Lyubov Orlova. Built in 1975 in the former Yugoslavia as Alla Tarasova, she underwent a $13 million refit in 1998 managed by Master Mariner AB, Sweden.

During the summer of 2009 Adventure Canada of Mississauga, Ontario, Canada carried passengers through the Northwest Passage on the Clipper Adventurer.

On 27 August 2010, Clipper Adventurer ran aground of a supposedly uncharted rock in the waters of Nunavut's Coronation Gulf during a cruise. The collision damaged the ship's ballast and fuel tanks, leading pollution to be released into the Coronation Gulf. 128 passengers and 69 crew members were stranded until they were rescued by the  CCGS Amundsen. It was later found that the rock was indeed a known hazard and had already been properly reported by the Canadian Hydrographic Service.

The salvage job was awarded to Resolve Marine Group, a Florida-based Salvage company.  On 18 September 2010, the ship was successfully towed into Cambridge Bay.

External links 
 Itineraries and deckplans

References 

Expedition cruising
Cruise ships
1975 ships
Passenger ships of the Soviet Union
Ships built in Yugoslavia